Ivankova is a rural locality (a village) in Leninskoye Rural Settlement, Kudymkarsky District, Perm Krai, Russia. The population was 36 as of 2010.

Geography 
Ivankova is located 42 km south of Kudymkar (the district's administrative centre) by road. Pyatina is the nearest rural locality.

References 

Rural localities in Kudymkarsky District